The Alabama–Georgia football rivalry is a college football rivalry game between the Crimson Tide of the University of Alabama and the Bulldogs of the University of Georgia. The two bordering state schools were charter members of the Southeastern Conference (SEC) in 1933 and played every season from 1944-1965. Despite no longer playing annually, Alabama and Georgia have met in several nationally important matchups in the twenty-first century, including three Southeastern Conference Championship Games and two College Football Playoff National Championship Games since 2010, bringing the rivalry back into national prominence.

History
The two southern schools first met in 1895 in Columbus, Georgia. Georgia defeated Alabama by a score of 30–6. The teams did not meet again until 1901, another Georgia win, then continued to meet on a regular basis for the next several decades.

The teams played each other in every season from 1944 to 1965. Highlights of that era included two separate five-game winning streaks by Alabama and the first-ever college football game to be televised by the ABC network, Alabama's 21-6 win in 1960 in Birmingham.

In 1963, The Saturday Evening Post magazine reported that Alabama coach Paul "Bear" Bryant and Georgia athletic director and former coach Wally Butts had conspired to fix the 1962 game, which Alabama won 35–0. After the story broke, Butts resigned as athletic director, though Butts and Bryant denied the allegations. The two sued the magazine's publisher for libel, and the case reached the United States Supreme Court as Curtis Publishing Co. v. Butts (1967). The Supreme Court ruled in favor of Butts, with the publisher eventually being ordered to pay more than $3 million in damages. The lawsuit has been credited with leading to the end of the magazine.

Following the scandal, the schools decided to end their annual series after the 1965 meeting, which the Bulldogs won 18-17 on a last-second controversial flea-flicker. They have played only sporadically since, including just four meetings from 1971 to 1982, an era in which the Tide or Bulldogs won at least a share of every SEC title.

Divisional era (1992–present) 
When the SEC expanded to twelve teams and split into two divisions in 1992, Alabama was placed in the West Division, while Georgia was in the East. Each team in the league was matched with two "permanent" cross-division rivals. Because Alabama and Georgia were not paired as permanent rivals, they would play only on a rotating basis (twice in an eight-year cycle) or in the newly created SEC Championship Game.

Later scheduling modifications, as well as the SEC's expansion to 14 teams, have resulted in just one permanent cross-division rival for each team, with Alabama playing Tennessee and Georgia facing off against Auburn. The Crimson Tide and Bulldogs now see each other in the regular season only twice per 12-year cycle.

Since 1992, Alabama holds a 7–4 record over Georgia, which includes five post-season contests, including three SEC Championship Games won by Alabama and two College Football Playoff National Championship appearances split between the two teams. Many of the recent Alabama-Georgia matchups have been between highly ranked teams, with the regular-season matchups in 2007 and 2008 hosting College Gameday. In 2007, #16 Georgia beat #23 Alabama in Overtime, 26-23. #8 Alabama won the 2008 matchup in Athens, a 41-30 upset over #3 Georgia. 

The teams first post-season matchup came in the 2012 SEC Championship Game on December 1, 2012 in the Georgia Dome in Atlanta, Georgia, with the winner likely to play for the national championship. #2 Alabama defeated #3 Georgia, 32–28, after Georgia's final play fell five yards short of a winning score.

Saban–Smart rivalry, nationally prominent matchups (2016–present) 
Following the 2015 season, Georgia hired longtime Alabama assistant and former Georgia player Kirby Smart as head coach. Smart has since led Georgia to four post-season games against the Tide and his former boss, head coach Nick Saban.

The first Saban–Smart match-up came following the 2017 season. In the 2018 College Football Playoff National Championship game at Mercedes-Benz Stadium in Atlanta, Alabama overcame a 13-point deficit to defeat Georgia by a score of 26–23 in overtime, to clinch its 17th national championship, Alabama’s win marked the 1st time in college football history that a program had won the national championship game despite not having the lead the entire game.

The following season, the teams played in the 2018 SEC Championship Game, also played in Atlanta. #4 Georgia led 28–14 with just over three minutes remaining in the third quarter, only to see #1 Alabama once again rally to win, 35–28.

The teams next met during the 2020 regular season in Tuscaloosa, Alabama. This was a highly anticipated game, with both teams ranked in the top three and hosting College GameDay. It was the first meeting in Tuscaloosa since 2007. The game was back and forth throughout the first half, and Georgia led 24–20 at halftime. In the second half, however, Alabama outscored Georgia with 21 unanswered points and won 41–24.

On December 4, 2021 the two teams met again in the SEC Championship Game in Atlanta.  Georgia was undefeated and ranked number one in the nation at the time while Alabama had one loss and was ranked number three.  Alabama again prevailed, 41-24, this time dominating the majority of the game.  Both teams qualified for the College Football Playoff, however, and each prevailed in their national semifinal matchup, setting up a rematch on January 10, 2022, in the College Football Playoff National Championship game.  This marked the shortest span between two successive matchups in the history of the teams' rivalry. Georgia won the National Championship with a 33-18 victory, the Bulldogs' first National Championship since 1980. It was also Georgia's first win over Alabama since September 27, 2007, snapping a seven-game losing streak. Georgia's win also marked the first time since conference championship games began to be played in 1992 that a  football program won the AP National Championship after losing its respective conference championship game in the same season.  Though Alabama had on two occasions, in 2011 and 2017, previously won the AP National Championship without even qualifying for or playing in the SEC Championship Game, due to losses to the SEC West Champion LSU   and SEC West Co-Champion Auburn  in those years, respectively.

Game results

See also 
 List of NCAA college football rivalry games

References

College football rivalries in the United States
Alabama Crimson Tide football
Georgia Bulldogs football